Elizabeth of Russia (1709–1762) was the ruler of Russia from 1741 until her death in 1762.

Elizabeth of Russia may also refer to:
 Elisiv of Kiev (1025-1067), daughter of Yaroslav I the Wise
 Grand Duchess Elizabeth Antonovna of Russia (1743–1782), daughter of Grand Duchess Anna Leopoldovna of Russia
 Elizabeth Alexeievna (Louise of Baden) (1779–1826), wife of Alexander I of Russia
 Grand Duchess Elizabeth Alexandrovna of Russia (1806 – 1808), daughter of Alexander I of Russia, died in childhood
 Grand Duchess Elizabeth Mikhailovna of Russia (1826–1845), daughter of Grand Duke Michael Pavlovich of Russia
 Princess Elisabeth of Saxe-Altenburg (1865–1927), daughter of Prince Moritz of Saxe-Altenburg; wife of Grand Duke Constantine Constantinovich of Russia as Grand Duchess Elizabeth Mavrikievna of Russia
 Princess Elisabeth of Hesse and by Rhine (1864–1918), daughter of Louis IV, Grand Duke of Hesse; wife of Grand Duke Sergei Alexandrovich of Russia of Russia as Grand Duchess Elizabeth Feodorovna of Russia